OHAUS Corporation manufactures balances and scales for the laboratory, education, industrial and speciality markets worldwide.  With headquarters in Parsippany, New Jersey, United States, OHAUS Corporation has offices in Europe, Asia and Latin America.

History

Early years
OHAUS Corporation was founded in 1907, when Gustav Ohaus decided to forgo a career in the gray iron foundry business for a business venture with his father, Karl, a German-trained scale mechanic. Together, they established a scale repair business in Newark, New Jersey.

In 1912, the father-son team introduced the Ohaus Harvard Trip Balance, a mechanical balance which became popular. Soon after, in 1914, Gustav and Karl Ohaus were incorporated as the Newark Scale Works, coinciding with their first production of grain testing equipment and the issuing of their first patent.

The following two decades included the patenting of the self-aligning agate bearing, designed to reduce friction and increase accuracy, and the introduction of their first die-cast base, which allowed for closer tolerances than sand castings.

World War II and after
The onset of World War II increased the demand for laboratory equipment, and thus an additional Ohaus-owned factory opened in 1941.  In 1947, the former Newark Scale Works was incorporated as OHAUS Scale Corporation, and soon after occupied a new factory in Union, New Jersey.

Advancements
In the 1950s and 1960s Ohaus introduced its Cent-O-Gram and Dial-O-Gram scales, and became the first company to incorporate magnetic damping in low-cost reloading products, providing quicker results. In 1968 they introduced a new line of school balances – simplified for use by younger students, while also affording the accuracy required for mass measurement instruction. In 1969, the Gustav Ohaus Award program was established to honor educators for their commitment to academics and excellence in science teaching.
The company grew rapidly under Gustav's sons Robert and William, who were president and COO respectively. Robert's expert guidance of the engineering and manufacturing areas and corporate governance significantly increased the breadth and capability of the product line, while William's expertise in finance, marketing and sales rapidly increased the dealer base in the US and over 80 countries.

Metric Teaching Aids
The year 1975 brought the introduction of Metric Teaching Aids, designed to simplify instruction of linear, volumetric, mass and temperature concepts for younger students.  This same year, OHAUS established offices in England and Germany.

Electronic balances
Ongoing advancements in technology allowed OHAUS to introduce its first line of precision electronic balances in 1979, incorporating easily read digital displays and electronic weight measuring mechanisms for quicker results. In 1982, OHAUS introduced the Port-O-Gram balance, the first laboratory-quality portable balance with 1:20,000 resolution.  The first electronic moisture determination balance soon followed in 1984.

Latin America
With an office newly opened in Mexico, serving Latin America, OHAUS changed its name to OHAUS Corporation, supporting its increasingly broadened position in the balance market.  That same year, in 1988, OHAUS Corporation introduced the "E2 Series Electronic Toploading Balance, a no frills electronic balance - the first of its kind."

Asia
In 1993, OHAUS established an office in Japan to serve Asia, and in 1998, OHAUS established offices in Korea and China.

Europe
In 1999, a new OHAUS Europe office opened in Nanikon, Switzerland, serving as the coordinating point for the sales and marketing efforts for all of Europe.

The 1990s
Throughout the 1990s, OHAUS received ISO 9002 registration for its facility in Cambridge, England, and ISO 9001 registration for its Corporate Headquarters in Florham Park, New Jersey. OHAUS Corporation introduced the first modular balances, the Voyager and the Explorer, and the first full-featured portable balance, the Navigator. The 1990s closed out with OHAUS announcing a major product introduction schedule, including Adventurer™ precision balances, ES series of low profile bench scales, Champ™ II bench scales with CD indicators, Compact and Hand-Held scales.  OHAUS was acquired by its competitor Mettler Toledo Inc, in 1990.

Twenty-first century
In 2001, OHAUS moved its global headquarters to Pine Brook, New Jersey. Soon after, in 2007, OHAUS celebrated its centenary.

In 2010, OHAUS moved its global headquarters to Parsippany-Troy Hills, New Jersey.  For financial reasons the European office moved from Nänikon, Switzerland to Warsaw, Poland in 2013.

External links 
 Ohaus Corporation

References

united:lavayet is sac

Companies based in New Jersey